Roma invicta is a Latin phrase, meaning "unconquered Rome". It was an inspirational motto used until the Fall of the Western Roman Empire in 476 AD. This symbolic statement was later printed onto gold coins.

See also
 Roman Empire

References

Latin words and phrases
History of the Roman Empire